Great Dixter is a house in Northiam, East Sussex, England. It was built in 1910–12 by architect Edwin Lutyens, who combined an existing mid-15th century house on the site with a similar structure brought from Benenden, Kent, together with his own additions. It is a Grade I listed building. The garden, widely known for its continuous tradition of sophisticated plantsmanship, is Grade I listed in the National Register of Historic Parks and Gardens.

House 

The original Northiam house, known as Dixter, dating from the mid-15th century, was acquired by a businessman named Nathaniel Lloyd in 1909. He had a 16th-century house in a similar style moved from Kent and the two were combined with new work by Lutyens to create a much larger house, which was rechristened Great Dixter. It is a romantic recreation of a medieval manor house, complete with great hall, parlour, solar and yeoman's hall.

Garden 
Lloyd and Lutyens began the garden at Great Dixter, but it was Lloyd's son Christopher Lloyd, a well known garden writer and television personality, who made it famous. The garden is in the arts and crafts style, and features topiary, a long border, an orchard and a wild flower meadow. The planting is profuse, yet structured, and has featured many bold experiments of form, colour and combination. The garden is currently managed by Fergus Garrett, who worked closely with Lloyd up until his death in 2006 as Head Gardener and introduced a number of innovations  into the planting scheme.

In the grounds of Great Dixter are three 18th-century oast houses, under a common roof, and a 15th-century barn. These are Grade II* listed.

Management 
The house and garden are open to the public from the end of March to late October each year, while the nursery is open year-round. In 2003, the Great Dixter Charitable Trust was established by Christopher Lloyd to ensure the property was preserved after his death.  Education is at the heart of the trust's work. A number of  student placements and scholarships are offered every year to ensure that the skills of managing an intricate, complex garden are passed on.  In addition, study days, week-long Symposia, workshops and lectures are held frequently

References

External links

Official site
Daily pics from Great Dixter Garden

Gardens in East Sussex
Country houses in East Sussex
Grade I listed buildings in East Sussex
Grade I listed houses
Historic house museums in East Sussex
Houses completed in 1912
Arts and Crafts architecture in England
Works of Edwin Lutyens in England
1912 establishments in England
Hall houses
Northiam